The knobby rocksnail, scientific name Lithasia curta, is a species of medium-sized freshwater snail, an aquatic gilled gastropod mollusk in the family Pleuroceridae. This species is endemic to the United States.

References

Molluscs of the United States
Pleuroceridae
Gastropods described in 1868
Taxonomy articles created by Polbot